Chia Ching or Jiajing or Jiaqing may refer to the following Chinese emperors:
 Jiajing Emperor of the Ming dynasty
 Jiaqing Emperor of the Qing dynasty

Human name disambiguation pages